Lion's Den is a 2008 Argentine drama film directed, co-written, co-produced and co-edited by Pablo Trapero. Addressing motherhood within the prison system, it stars Martina Gusmán, Elli Medeiros and Rodrigo Santoro. The film competed in the Competition at the 2008 Cannes Film Festival.

It was Argentina's official submission for the 2009 Academy Award for Best Foreign Language Film.

Plot
In Buenos Aires, the independently minded student Julia Zárate awakens in her apartment with gore everywhere, her lover Nahuel stabbed, and their shared lover Ramiro covered with blood but alive.

Julia is pregnant and is sent to a special prison wing for mothers and pregnant prisoners to await trial. She befriends Marta, a fellow prisoner who has two children and helps her to understand prison life as a mother. Julia delivers Tomás and her mother tries to kidnap him, causing a prison riot. When Ramiro accuses her of murdering Nahuel, her chances of raising Tomás fall.

Cast 
 Martina Gusmán - Julia
 Elli Medeiros - Sofia
 Rodrigo Santoro - Ramiro
 Laura García - Marta
 Tomás Plotinsky - Tomás VI
 Leonardo Sauma - Ugo Casman

See also
 List of submissions to the 81st Academy Awards for Best Foreign Language Film
 List of Argentine submissions for the Academy Award for Best Foreign Language Film

External links
 

2008 films
2000s Argentine films
Argentine drama films
Films directed by Pablo Trapero
Films set in prison
Women in prison films